Deh Now (also Romanized as Dehnow) is a village in Nurali Rural District, in the Central District of Delfan County, Lorestan Province, Iran. At the 2006 census, its population was 264, in 57 families.

Notes 

Towns and villages in Delfan County